The 2022 BWF Continental Circuit was the sixteenth season of the BWF Continental Circuit of badminton, a circuit of 70 tournaments. The 70 tournaments were divided into three levels:
International Challenge (28 tournaments)
International Series (24 tournaments)
Future Series (18 tournaments).

Each of these tournaments offered different ranking points and prize money.

Points distribution 
Below is the point distribution table for each phase of the tournament based on the BWF points system for the BWF Continental Circuit events.

Results 
Below is the schedule released by Badminton World Federation:

Winners

International Challenge

International Series

Future Series

Statistics

Performance by countries 
Below are the 2022 BWF Continental Circuit performances by country. Only countries who have won a title are listed:

International Challenge

International Series

Future Series

Performance by categories 
These tables were calculated after the finals of the Malaysia International.

Men's singles

Women's singles

Men's doubles

Women's doubles

Mixed doubles

References 

2022 in badminton
Badminton tours and series
BWF International Challenge
BWF International Series
BWF Future Series